The 2018 season is Johor Darul Ta'zim Football Club's 45th season in club history and 6th season in the Malaysia Super League after rebranding their name from Johor FC.

Background

Background information
Johor Darul Ta'zim FC won their 2017 Malaysia Super League to become the first Malaysian club to win the league titles for four consecutive seasons (2014–2017).

JDT still holds an unbeaten home ground record in Super League after extending the record up to 59 matches from 3 July 2012 (won against Sabah FA by 2–1) until 20 September 2017 which last they won against Kelantan FA by 3–0).

JDT failed to defense their Malaysia FA Cup after lost to Pahang FA with an aggregate 4–3 on 23 April 2017.

JDT win their 1st title Malaysia Cup after beat Kedah FA by 2–0 on 4 November 2017 at Shah Alam Stadium.

Unfortunately, JDT failed to qualify for Final ASEAN zonal after lost to Filipino club Ceres Negros F.C. in the AFC Cup Semi-Finals with an aggregate 4–4 (away goal rules).

Friendly matches

Thailand Pre-season Tour 2018

Competitions

Overview

Malaysia Super League

Table

Results summary

Malaysia Super League fixtures and results

Malaysia FA Cup

Malaysia Cup

Group C

Bracket

AFC Champions League

Qualifying play-off

AFC Cup

Group H

Club Statistics

Appearances
Correct as of match played on 06 October 2018

1 Includes AFC Champions League qualifying play-offs and AFC Cup matches.

Top scorers

Hat-tricks

Top assists

Clean sheets

Discipline

Transfers and contracts

In

Out

Contract Extension

Home Attendance 
All matches will be played at Larkin Stadium.

R denotes Match(s) to be played during the Month of Ramadhan

Attendance (Each Competitions)

See also 
 2017 Johor Darul Ta'zim F.C. season

References 

Johor Darul Ta'zim F.C.
Malaysian football clubs 2018 season